George F. "Buddy" Sasser is a former American football coach and athletics administrator. As commissioner of the Big South Conference between 1989 and 1996, Sasser was responsible for increasing membership, gaining automatic bids to the NCAA basketball tournament and adding basketball television exposure for the conference.

Biography
Born in Conway, South Carolina, Sasser played college football for the University of North Carolina Tarheels earning two letters, the last in 1956. Sasser served as athletic director and head football coach at Conway High School from 1963 to 1970, leading the Tigers to a 66–17–5 record. He was assistant football coach and assistant athletic director at Appalachian State University from 1972 until 1977, and was athletic director and head football coach from 1977 until 1982 at Wofford College. He served as Coastal Carolina University's athletic director from 1986 until 1989 and again from 1996 until 1999.

Honors and awards
In 1982, Sasser was named Kodak Coach of the Year for the college division. He was inducted, along with three other Coastal Carolina University athletic administrators and student athletes, in the inaugural class of the Big South Conference Hall of Fame.

Each year, the George F. "Buddy" Sasser Cup Trophy (named for him in 2000) is awarded to the Big South member institution that has the most successful year in athletics. Coastal Carolina University's Athletic Hall of Fame was named in honor of Sasser on June 4, 2003.

Head coaching record

College

References

Year of birth missing (living people)
Living people
Appalachian State Mountaineers football coaches
Big South Conference commissioners
Coastal Carolina Chanticleers athletic directors
East Tennessee State Buccaneers athletic directors
East Tennessee State Buccaneers football coaches
North Carolina Tar Heels football players
Wofford Terriers athletic directors
Wofford Terriers football coaches
High school football coaches in South Carolina
People from Conway, South Carolina